A Storm Was Coming is a 2020 Spanish documentary film directed and produced by Javier Fernández Vázquez. The documentary focuses on Ësáasi Eweera, one of the last kings of the Bubi people in the island of Bioko, Equatorial Guinea, who was captured by authorities in 1904 and died under strange circumstances.

Synopsis 
Ësáasi Eweera, one of the last kings of the Bubi people in the island of Bioko, Equatorial Guinea, opposed to the Spanish colonial authorities, is captured in 1904 by them and died under strange circumstances. The film reopens the case a century later. The official reports of the Spanish are read out by actors and contrasted with interviews with the Bubi.

Production 
Anunciaron tormenta was produced with the assistance of the City Council of Madrid and with the support of both ECAM and Progressio.

Reception 
The film premiered at the 70th Berlin International Film Festival and at the Pontevedra International Film Festival, where
it was the winner of the Latexos section. The film was also nominated to eight Goya Awards categories.  Fernando Bernal of 20 Minutos rated with 4.5 out of 5 stars.

References

External links 
 
 Cine Europa
 Film Affinity

2020 documentary films
Documentary films about historical events
Documentary films about Spain
Documentary films about African resistance to colonialism
Spanish documentary films
2020s Spanish-language films